Prutting is a municipality  in the district of Rosenheim in Bavaria in Germany.

References

Rosenheim (district)